Chicopee is an unincorporated community in Crawford County, Kansas, United States.  As of the 2020 census, the population of the community and nearby areas was 422.

History
Chicopee was a coal mining community.

The post office opened June 10, 1889, closed September 30, 1892, reopened October 8, 1892, and reclosed March 30, 1918.

Chicopee was the home of the defunct Idlehour amusement park.

Geography
Chicopee lies at the intersection of the county roads known as South 200th Street & East 530th Avenue,  by road southwest of downtown Pittsburg. The northwest corner of the town borders on the grounds of the Crestwood Country Club. The Crestwood golf course opened in 1958.

Demographics

For statistical purposes, the United States Census Bureau has defined Chicopee as a census-designated place (CDP).

References

Further reading

External links
 Crawford County maps: Current, Historic, KDOT

Census-designated places in Crawford County, Kansas
Census-designated places in Kansas